Pocock is a surname, and may refer to:
Andrew Pocock (born 1955), British High Commissioner to Nigeria
 Barbara Pocock, one of the candidates of the 2022 Australian federal election 
Bill Pocock (1884–1959), English footballer
Blair Pocock (born 1971), New Zealand cricketer
Colin Pocock (born 1972), South African beach volleyball player
Cyrena Sue Pocock (c. 1896–1964), American operatic contralto
David Pocock (born 1988), Zimbabwe-born Australian rugby union player
David Pocock (disambiguation), several other people
Edward Innes Pocock (1855–1905), Scottish rugby international
Fiona Pocock, English rugby union player
Sir George Pocock (1706–1792), Royal Navy Admiral
George Pocock (inventor) (1774–1843), English schoolteacher and inventor
George Yeomans Pocock (1891–1976), American boat builder and philosopher of rowing
H. R. S. Pocock (1904–1988), British businessman and author
Isaac Pocock (1782–1835), English dramatist and painter
John Pocock (died 1732), British Army general
John Pocock (cricketer) (1921–2003), English cricketer
J. G. A. Pocock (born 1924), British intellectual historian
Lena Margaret Pocock (1872–1957), British actress
Lilian Josephine Pocock (1883–1974), English stained glass artist
Mary Agard Pocock (1886-1977), a South African phycologist
Nancy Meek Pocock (1910–1998), Canadian activist
Nicholas Pocock (1740–1821), British artist
Nicholas Pocock (historian) (1814–1897), English academic and cleric
Nick Pocock (born 1951), English cricketer
Pat Pocock (born 1946), English cricketer
Philip Francis Pocock (1906–1984), Roman Catholic Archbishop of Toronto
Philip Pocock (born 1954), Canadian artist
Reginald Innes Pocock (1863–1947), British zoologist, arachnologist and mammalogist
Stuart Pocock, British medical statistician
Tim Pocock (born 1985), Australian actor
Thomas Pocock (clergyman) (1672–1745), English diarist
Tom Pocock (1925–2007), British naval historian
William Willmer Pocock (1813–1899), British architect

See also
Pocock Rowing (disambiguation)
Pococke